The 2007–08 Polish Cup was the fifty-fourth season of the annual Polish cup competition. It began on 1 August 2007 with the extra preliminary round and ended on 13 May 2008 with the Final, played at Stadion GKS, Bełchatów. The winners qualified for the first qualifying round of the UEFA Cup. Dyskobolia Grodzisk Wielkopolski were the defending champions.

Extra preliminary round

! colspan="3" style="background:cornsilk;"|1 August 2007

|}

Notes
Note 1: Jagiellonia II Białystok withdrew from the competition and Jeziorak Iława were awarded a 3–0 walkover.
Note 2: Polonia Przemyśl withdrew from the competition and Przyszłość Rogów were awarded a 3–0 walkover.

Preliminary round

! colspan="3" style="background:cornsilk;"|31 July 2007

|-
! colspan="3" style="background:cornsilk;"|7 August 2007

|-
! colspan="3" style="background:cornsilk;"|8 August 2007

|}

Notes
Note 1: Olimpia Elbląg withdrew from the competition and Ruch Wysokie Mazowieckie were awarded a 3–0 walkover.
Note 2: Zagłębie II Lubin withdrew from the competition and Skalnik Gracze were awarded a 3–0 walkover.

Round 1

! colspan="3" style="background:cornsilk;"|28 August 2007

|-
! colspan="3" style="background:cornsilk;"|29 August 2007

|-
! colspan="3" style="background:cornsilk;"|4 September 2007

|}

Notes
Note 1: Zawisza Bydgoszcz withdrew from the competition and Ruch Chorzów were awarded a 3–0 walkover.

Round 2

! colspan="3" style="background:cornsilk;"|25 September 2007

|-
! colspan="3" style="background:cornsilk;"|26 September 2007

|-
! colspan="3" style="background:cornsilk;"|10 October 2007

|}

Notes
Note 1: Pogoń Szczecin withdrew from the competition and Stal Stalowa Wola were awarded a 3–0 walkover.

Round 3

! colspan="3" style="background:cornsilk;"|30 October 2007

|-
! colspan="3" style="background:cornsilk;"|31 October 2007

|-
! colspan="3" style="background:cornsilk;"|18 November 2007

|}

Quarter-finals

|}

First leg

Second leg

Semi-finals

|}

First leg

Second leg

Final

References

External links
 90minut.pl 

Polish Cup seasons
Polish Cup
Cup